The Light at the Edge of the World is a 1971 adventure film, adapted from Jules Verne's classic 1905 adventure novel The Lighthouse at the End of the World (Le Phare du bout du monde). The plot involves piracy in the South Atlantic during the mid-19th century, with a theme of survival in extreme circumstances, and events centering on an isolated lighthouse.

Despite having a large Hollywood budget, collaboration with prestigious foreign film studios, exotic shooting locations in Europe and some of the biggest name movie stars, the movie was mainly a failure at the box office.

Plot
The year is 1865. Will Denton (Kirk Douglas) is a jaded American miner escaping a troubled past. Seeking isolation for two reasons – to mend his broken heart after a failed romance during the California Gold Rush, and also to escape punishment after he murdered a man in a gunfight – Denton tends a lonely and isolated lighthouse with a minimal crew of three men, himself included.

The lighthouse sits on a fictional rocky island adorned with many caves carved by the crashing waves of the Atlantic Ocean; it is however set in the geographic location of the Tierra del Fuego archipelago at the southern tip of South America. Before the building of the Panama Canal, the waters off Cape Horn were perhaps the busiest and richest shipping lanes in the world (all shipping between Europe and the western coast of The United States had to go around the Cape) and therefore very lucrative.

Denton is contented to retreat from the world and be away from the problems of civilization, and quickly adjusts to his new supervisor, old Argentine sea dog Captain Moriz (Fernando Rey) and his youthful and innocent assistant Felipe (Massimo Ranieri).

A shipload of utterly malicious and sadistic pirates show up, murder Moriz and Felipe, and extinguish the light. They are wreckers, brigands who mislead ships into the rocks to loot the cargo and prey upon the victims. Their leader Captain Jonathan Kongre (Yul Brynner) is a diabolical fiend with a seductive and charismatic facade.

Denton hides out in the caves and amongst the rocks, hiding from the pirates. He saves Italian wreck survivor Montefiore (Renato Salvatori) from the pirates' massacre, and together they wage a war of guerrilla tactics against Kongre and his cutthroats.

Kongre breaks his own rule by keeping one captive alive – a beautiful Englishwoman named Arabella (Samantha Eggar).

Montefiore is captured while creating a diversion for an attempt by Denton to rescue Arabella, who however opts for remaining with Kongre.
On the next day, Kongre has Montefiori flayed alive on his ship, trying to draw Denton out of hiding, but Denton shoots Montefiori from afar.
Angered, Kongre gives Arabella to his men and withdraws to the lighthouse. Denton uses the pirates' cannon to sink their ship, along with all the pirates except for Kongre.

The finale of the film is a showdown between the only two survivors left on the island, Denton and Kongre. During the fight an explosion occurs. Kongre is set on fire and falls from the lighthouse.

Cast 
Kirk Douglas as Will Denton
Yul Brynner as Jonathan Kongre 
Samantha Eggar as Arabella
Jean-Claude Drouot as Virgilio
Fernando Rey as Captain Moriz
Renato Salvatori as Montefiore
Massimo Ranieri as Felipe
Aldo Sambrell as Tarcante
Tito García as Emilio
Víctor Israel as Das Mortes

Production
In 1962 it was announced Hardy Kruger and Jean Marais would star in an adaptation of the novel for Columbia Pictures.

The project was re-activated in the late 1960s by Bryna, Kirk Douglas' production company. Douglas hired Kevin Billington to direct in March 1970. Douglas made the film as a co production with Alexander Salkyind's Vulkano Productions. National General Pictures agreed to distribute.

Finance was mostly raised from a bank in Spain. It involved people from France, Spain and Italy. Billington said "there are about 23 c-production deals; there are problems about casting and about language." Douglas said he was paid "a lot of money" for the movie, estimated at being $1 million.

Filming took place in Spain.
Some of the shooting locations included:

 Jávea, Alicante, Valencia, Spain
 La Manga del Mar Menor, Murcia, Spain
 Cadaqués, Girona, Catalonia, Spain
 Cap de Creus, Girona, Catalonia, Spain
 La Pedriza, Manzanares el Real, Madrid, Spain

References

External links

 DVD Savant Review: "The Light at the Edge of the World"

1970s adventure films
1971 films
American adventure films
Bryna Productions films
English-language Spanish films
Films based on French novels
Films based on works by Jules Verne
Films directed by Kevin Billington
Films scored by Piero Piccioni
Films set in Argentina
Films set in Chile
Films set in 1865
Films set on beaches
Films set on islands
Pirate films
Spanish adventure films
1970s Spanish-language films
Tierra del Fuego
Works set in lighthouses
1970s American films